The 2019 German Indoor Athletics Championships was the 66th edition of the national championship in indoor track and field for Germany. It was held on 16–17 February at the Arena Leipzig in Leipzig. A total of 24 events, 12 for men and 12 for women, were contested. It served as preparation for the 2019 European Athletics Indoor Championships.

Several national championship events were staged elsewhere: combined events were held on 26–27 January in the Sporthalle Brandberge in Halle, the relays were held on 24 February at the Glaspalast Sindelfingen in Sindelfingen, while racewalking events were hosted in Halle on 1 March.

Results

Men

Women

References

Results
 Medalists
 Results
 Combined Events Results

German Indoor Athletics Championships
German Indoor Athletics Championships
German Indoor Athletics Championships
German Indoor Athletics Championships
Sports competitions in Leipzig